American singer and songwriter Zella Day has released three studio albums, four extended plays, fourteen singles, and seven music videos.

Studio albums

Extended plays

Singles

As lead artist

As featured artist

Promotional singles

Other releases

Guest appearances

Special releases

Music videos

References

Pop music discographies
Discographies of American artists